
Gmina Ulan-Majorat is a rural gmina (administrative district) in Radzyń Podlaski County, Lublin Voivodeship, in eastern Poland.

Villages
Gmina Ulan-Majorat contains the villages and settlements of Domaszewnica, Gąsiory, Kępki, Klębów, Kolonia Domaszewnica, Kolonia Domaszewska, Paskudy, Rozwadów, Sętki, Skrzyszew, Sobole, Stanisławów, Stok, Ulan Duży, Ulan Mały, Ulan-Majorat, Wierzchowiny, Zakrzew, Zarzec Ulański and Żyłki.

Neighbouring gminas
Gmina Ulan-Majorat is bordered by the gminas of Borki, Kąkolewnica Wschodnia, Łuków, Radzyń Podlaski and Wojcieszków.

References
Polish official population figures 2006

Ulan-Majorat
Gmina Ulan Majorat